2018 Academy Awards may refer to:

 90th Academy Awards, the Academy Awards ceremony that took place in 2018, honoring the best in film for 2017
 91st Academy Awards, the Academy Awards ceremony that took place in 2019, honoring the best in film for 2018